Noseda is a surname. Notable people with the surname include:

Arianna Noseda (born 1997), Italian rower
Gianandrea Noseda (born 1964), Italian conductor
Jeremy Noseda (born 1963), British racehorse trainer
Sergio Noja Noseda (1931–2008), Italian professor

See also
Noceda (disambiguation)